Dickinson College is a private liberal arts college in Carlisle, Pennsylvania. Founded in 1773 as Carlisle Grammar School, Dickinson was chartered on September 9, 1783, making it the first college to be founded after the formation of the United States. Dickinson was founded by Benjamin Rush, a signer of the United States Declaration of Independence, and named in honor of John Dickinson, a signer of the Constitution who was later the governor of Pennsylvania, and his wife Mary Norris Dickinson. They donated much of their extensive personal libraries to the new college.

The Dickinson School of Law is located adjacent to the college campus and was founded in 1834 as its law department. It received an independent charter in 1890 and ended all affiliations with the college in 1917. In 2000, the law school merged with the Pennsylvania State University.

History

18th–20th centuries
The Carlisle Grammar School was founded in 1773 as a frontier Latin school for young men in western Pennsylvania. Within years Carlisle's elite, such as James Wilson and John Montgomery, were pushing for the development of the school as a college. In 1782, Benjamin Rush, a physician who was a prominent leader during and after the American Revolution, met in Philadelphia with Montgomery and William Bingham, a prominent businessman and politician. As their conversation about founding a frontier college in Carlisle took place on his porch, "Bingham's Porch" was long a rallying cry at Dickinson.

Dickinson College was chartered by the Pennsylvania legislature on September 9, 1783, six days after the signing of the Treaty of Paris (1783) that ended the American Revolution; it was the first college to be founded in the newly independent nation. Rush intended to name the college after the president of Pennsylvania John Dickinson and his wife Mary Norris Dickinson, proposing "John and Mary's College." The Dickinsons had given the new college an extensive library which they jointly owned, one of the largest libraries in the colonies. The name Dickinson College was chosen instead. When founded, its location west of the Susquehanna River made it the westernmost college in the United States. For the first meeting of the trustees, held in April 1784, Rush made his first journey to Carlisle. The trustees selected Charles Nisbet, a Scottish minister and scholar, to serve as the college's first president. He arrived and began to serve on July 4, 1785, serving until his unexpected death in 1804.

A combination of financial troubles and faculty dissension led to a college closing from 1816 to 1821. In 1832, when the trustees were unable to resolve a faculty curriculum dispute, they ordered Dickinson's temporary closure a second time.

The law school dates to 1833. It became a separate school in 1890, although the law school and the college continued to share a president until 1912. The law school is now affiliated with the Pennsylvania State University.

Among the 18th-century graduates of Dickinson were Robert Cooper Grier and Roger Brooke Taney, who later became U.S. Supreme Court justices, and served together on the court for 18 years.

During the 19th century, two noted Dickinson College alumni had prominent roles in the lead-up to the Civil War. They were James Buchanan, the 15th president of the United States, and Roger Brooke Taney, the 5th chief justice of the United States. Dickinson is one of three liberal arts colleges to have graduated a president and a chief justice (Bowdoin and Amherst are the others). Taney led the Supreme Court in its ruling on the Dred Scott v. Sandford decision, which held that Congress could not prohibit slavery in federal territories, overturning the Missouri Compromise. Buchanan threw the full prestige of his administration behind congressional approval of the Lecompton Constitution in Kansas. During the Civil War, the campus and town of Carlisle were occupied twice by Confederate forces in 1863.

The town of Carlisle was also the location of the Carlisle Army Barracks, which was converted in the late 1870s for use as the Carlisle Indian Industrial School. In 1879 Dickinson College and the nearby Carlisle Indian School began a collaboration, when James Andrew McCauley, president of the college, led the first worship service at the Indian School. The collaboration between the institutions lasted almost four decades, from the opening day to the closing of the Indian School in 1918. Dickinson College professors served as chaplains and special faculty to the Native American students. Dickinson College students volunteered services, observed teaching methods, and participated in events at the Indian School. Dickinson College accepted select Indian School students to attend its Preparatory School ("Conway Hall") and gain college-level education.

When George Metzger, class of 1798, died in 1879, he left his land and $25,000 to the town of Carlisle to found a college for women. In 1881, the Metzger Institute opened. The college operated independently until 1913, when its building was leased to Dickinson College for the education of women. The building served as a women's dorm until 1963.

In 1887, Zatae Longsdorff became the first woman to graduate from Dickinson. In 1901, John Robert Paul Brock became the first black man to graduate from Dickinson; in 1919, Esther Popel Shaw was the first black woman to graduate.

Dickinson also admitted Native American students directly: Thomas Marshall was one of the first such students at Dickinson. In 1910, Frank Mount Pleasant was the first Native American to graduate from Dickinson College.

In the 1990s, the college experienced financial troubles stemming from poor management and acceptance rates climbed upwards. Henry Clarke, an alumnus who developed the Klondike bar into a national brand for an ice cream bar, founded the Clarke Forum for Contemporary Issues at Dickinson College, and in 1994 established the Clarke Center. William Durden, who became the 27th President in 1999, was credited with improving financial climate and revamping the school academics.

21st century
Dickinson's acceptance rate is 35%, and the institutional endowment has more than doubled since 2000.

In 2000 Dickinson opened a new science building, Tome Hall, a state-of-the-art interdisciplinary facility to host astronomy, computer science, math, and physics. Tome houses Dickinson's innovative "Workshop Physics" program and was the first stage of a new science complex. Opened in 2008, the LEED Gold certified Rector Science Complex serves as a place of scientific exploration and learning in an environment that is artful and sustainable. Featuring  of laboratories, classrooms, and research facilities, it houses the departments of biology, chemistry, psychology, and interdisciplinary programs in biochemistry & molecular biology, and neuroscience. Courses in the emerging fields of bioinformatics and nanotechnology are also taught there.

On January 22, 2013, Dickinson announced that it had acquired Allison United Methodist Church for college expansion. A longtime landmark in Carlisle, Allison's limestone building and property is contiguous with the Benjamin Rush campus of Dickinson.

Dickinson aims for campus environmental sustainability through several initiatives. In the Sustainable Endowments Institute's 2010 green report card Dickinson was one of only 15 schools in the United States to receive an A−, the highest grade possible. In the same year, Dickinson was named a Sierra magazine "Cool" School" in its Comprehensive Guide to the Most Eco-Enlightened U.S. Colleges: Live (Green) and Learn. The college's commitment to making study of the environment and sustainability a defining characteristic of a Dickinson education was also recognised through being top of The Princeton Review's 2010 Green Honor Roll.

In 2008, the college bought 100% of its energy from wind power, had solar panels on campus, owned and operated an organic garden and farm, and had signed the American Colleges & Universities Presidents Climate Commitment. The college's emphasis on sustainability education recognizes its importance for innovation and the lives of tomorrow's graduates. The college had made a commitment to being carbon neutral by 2020. This involved a mixture of increased energy efficiency on campus, switching energy sourcing, promoting behavior change and carbon offsetting.

Academics
In addition to offering either a Bachelor of Arts or Bachelor of Science degree in 22 disciplinary majors and 20 interdisciplinary majors, Dickinson offers an engineering option through its 3:2 program, which consists of three years at Dickinson and two years at an engineering school of Rensselaer Polytechnic Institute or Case Western Reserve University. Upon successful completion of both portions of the program, students receive a B.S. degree from Dickinson in their chosen field and a B.S. in engineering from the engineering school. Its most popular majors, by 2021 graduates, were:
International Business/Trade/Commerce (58)
Political Science & Government (35)
Psychology (32)
Biology/Biological Sciences (25)
Economics (25)
Neuroscience (23)
Biochemistry & Molecular Biology (21)

Campus

Dickinson's quiet campus is three blocks from the main square in the historic small town of Carlisle, the county seat of Cumberland County, Pennsylvania, and the site of the nation's second oldest military base, Carlisle Barracks, which is now used as the U.S. Army War College. The campus is characterized by limestone-clad buildings and has numerous trees.

The frontier grammar school was founded in 1773 and housed in a small, two-room brick building on Liberty Avenue, near Bedford and Pomfret streets. When Dickinson College was founded in 1783, this building was expanded to accommodate all the functions. In 1799 the Penn family sold  on the western edge of Carlisle to the nascent college, which became its campus. On June 20 of that year, the cornerstone was laid by founding trustee John Montgomery for a building on the new land. The twelve-room building burned to the ground on February 3, 1803, five weeks after opening its doors. The college operations were temporarily returned to their previous accommodations.

Within weeks of the fire, a national fundraising campaign was launched, enticing donations from President Thomas Jefferson, Secretary of State James Madison, Chief Justice John Marshall, and many others. Benjamin Latrobe, already noted for his design work on the Bank of Pennsylvania and Princeton University's Nassau Hall, and soon-to-be named as Architect of the Capitol, was chosen to design the new structure. Latrobe's design for the building, now known as "West College" or "Old West," featured monumental and classical elements within a simple and subdued academic style. The building was to be capped with a classically inspired cupola graced by a figure of Triton. The local craftsman instead created a mermaid, which has since been a symbol of the college. Latrobe, who donated his services to the college, visited the building for the first time in 1813. The total cost of West College topped $22,000 and, although classes began in 1805, work was not finished until 1822. More than 200 years after its doors opened for the first time, Old West is today the ceremonial heart of the college, as all students march through the open doors during convocation at the beginning of their freshman year, and march out the same doors to receive their degrees and graduate. Old West, which is listed on the National Register of Historic Places, also houses the college administration, several classrooms, a computer lab, and the college chapel.

Throughout the 19th century, Dickinson expanded across what has now become its main academic quadrangle, known formally as the John Dickinson Campus. Dickinson expanded across College Street to build the Holland Union Building and Waidner-Spahr Library, which along with several dormitories, makes up the Benjamin Rush Campus. Across High Street (U.S. Route 11) lies the Charles Nisbet Campus, home to the largest grouping of dormitories. The Dickinson School of Law, part of Penn State, lies directly to the south of the Nisbet Campus. Together these three grass-covered units compose the vast majority of the college's campus, though several outlying buildings surround these main areas. In addition, the college owns playing fields and a large organic farm, both of which are only a short distance from the main campus.

Buildings of note include:
 Althouse Hall - A science hall opened in 1958, Althouse housed the chemistry department until it moved to the new Rector Science Complex. Since the spring 2010 semester, this building houses the International Business & Management Program as well as the Economics department.
 Bosler Hall - Completed in 1886, the building was Dickinson's first purpose-built library. Today it houses foreign language classes.
 East College - Dickinson's second building, which at one time housed the college president and served as a dormitory and place of instruction. East College also served as Confederate hospital during the Battle of Carlisle in July 1863. Today East College houses the departments of religion, classical studies, English, and other humanities.

 Denny Hall - completed in 1896 but destroyed by fire in 1904, the current building dates to 1905 and was given in memory of Harmar Denny and his family, several of whom are Dickinson alumni. Denny currently houses the departments of political science, history, anthropology, and archeology, amongst others.
 Holland Union Building (HUB) - Opened in 1964, the HUB is Dickinson's expansive student union, and hosts the cafeteria, snack bar, an organic cafe, student offices and services, and the bookstore.
 Kline Athletic Center - Finished in 1979, the Kline Center is a multipurpose facility that houses many of the varsity and intramural sports that Dickinson offers. In addition, the building features a modern fitness center, pool, indoor track, basketball, squash, and racquetball courts, and a climbing wall.
 Rector Science Complex - Opened in 2008, the new science complex, crowned by Stuart and James halls, joined with Tome Hall to create a completely unified interdisciplinary science campus that houses the departments of biology, chemistry, psychology, and interdisciplinary programs in biochemistry, molecular biology, and neuroscience. This building was constructed on the site of James Hall, which formerly housed geology, psychology, and environmental science and was demolished in 2006.
 Stern Center for Global Education - Finished in 1885 as the Tome Scientific Hall, it was one of the nation's first science-only academic buildings. In 2000, a new science building was completed, taking the name Tome Hall. The Stern Center houses the college's global education programs and segments of international studies, international business and management, and East Asian studies majors.
 Tome Hall - Opened in the year 2000, Tome is the home to physics, astronomy, math, and computer science.
 Waidner-Spahr Library - Opened as the Spahr Library in 1967, the building was a modern home for Dickinson's rapidly expanding collection. In 1997 the building was reopened as the Waidner-Spahr Library, after a massive expansion and renovation project. It houses the library's collection of over 510,000 volumes and 1,600 periodicals, as well as student study space and computer labs.

Weiss Center - opened in 1929 as the Alumni Gymnasium. It was dramatically renovated in 1981 and now hosts the college's performing and fine arts departments. The building is also the home to the Trout Gallery, Dickinson's collection of fine arts.

Student life
Dickinson has a rich and varied student life with a variety of organizations involved in many different causes and interests. Its programs are geared only toward traditional students of typical college age. There are over a hundred organizations representing different facets of the college.

Theatre and performing arts
Working in cooperation with the Dickinson Department of Theatre and Dance, The Mermaid Players, Dickinson's student-run theatrical society, offers Dickinsonians the opportunity to experience live theatre in a variety of ways. Performances normally occur in Mathers Theater, located in the HUB, or The Cubiculo (aka the Cube), a black-box space located above the Carlisle Theater. However, their collective creativity does not limit them to 'traditional' spaces, as recent performances have seen the audience seated on the Mathers stage, or at the Dickinson Farm for an outdoor performance of 'The Grapes of Wrath'.

Athletics
The Dickinson Red Devils participate in intercollegiate sports at the NCAA Division III level as members of the Centennial Conference. The Red Devils sports uniforms of red, white, and black.

Dickinson has 23 varsity sports teams, including baseball and softball, men's and women's golf, men's and women's soccer, football, men's and women's tennis, men's and women's track, men's and women's basketball, men's and women's lacrosse, men's and women's swimming, men's and women's cross country, men's and women's riding, women's volleyball, and women's field hockey. The college also has a cheerleading squad and dozens of intramural and club sports including ice hockey, men's volleyball, lacrosse, soccer, and ultimate frisbee.

The school's cross-country teams are led by long-standing coach Don Nichter. The women's cross country team has made 15 consecutive appearances at the Division III National Championships. The men's team has seen similar success, with eight consecutive appearances at the nationals championships.

The current head coach of the Dickinson Red Devils football team is Brad Fordyce.

Dickinson won the 1958 men's lacrosse team national title and Roy Taylor Division championship, also defeating Penn State in its final game to clinch the title.

Dickinson men's lacrosse is led by head coach Dave Webster, whose squad posted a compiled record of 65–10 over 2010, 2011, 2012, and 2013 seasons. The team won three consecutive Centennial Conference championships (2011, 2012, 2013) and went to the NCAA Division III Men's Lacrosse Championship four consecutive years (2010, 2011, 2012, 2013). Prior to the 2010 season, Dickinson had never been in the NCAA tournament. In 2013, Heather Morrison and Brandon Palladino were named the NCAA Division III Outstanding Players of the Year: Iroquois Nationals Award. Palladino was also the first player in Centennial Conference history to earn first-team all-conference honors all four years of his career.

Dickinson's men's basketball team won Centennial Conference titles in 2013 and 2015, and an at-large bid to the NCAA tournament in 2014. Dickinson reached the "Elite Eight" in the 2014 NCAA Division III men's basketball tournament. Gerry Wixted '15 was named D-III National Player of the Year in 2015.

In May 2019, the Dickinson softball team won the Centennial Conference championship. Madison Milaszewski earned the 2019 Centennial Conference MVP Award.

From 1963 to 1994, the college hosted the summer training camp for the Washington Redskins of the National Football League (NFL).

Music
Approximately 300 students study music at Dickinson every year. All music courses, performance studies, and ensembles are open to all Dickinson students regardless of major.
 
Music ensembles, which are open to all students by audition, include the Dickinson College Choir, the Dickinson College Collegium, the Dickinson College Jazz Ensemble, the Dickinson Orchestra, the Dickinson Improvisation and Collaboration Ensemble, and the Dickinson Chamber Ensembles. There is a vibrant music scene of student-led groups, which is supported by Dickinson by way of "The Band Aid," a college-sponsored practice space for student-led bands that is available to all students. The "Treehouse" dormitory sponsors frequent student-led group and individual performances, including open mike nights.

The Music House, a music-themed special interest housing option and the Dickinson College Student Music Society sponsor many activities throughout the year, including music field trips to metropolitan areas such as New York City and Washington, D.C., an annual children's concert, and music outreach programs to local schools.

Dickinson's radio station, WDCV-FM, has provided a wide range of music for the campus community for over 60 years.

Language, culture, and global education

Dickinson College has various on-campus houses and clubs dedicated to language and culture. On-campus student houses include a Romance Language House, the Russian House, the Global Community House, and the Social Justice House. The Center for Sustainable Living, or Treehouse, is an on-campus student house dedicated to sustainability and environmentalism.

Each year, some Dickinson students have the opportunity to spend one year abroad pursuing accredited study, at such institutions as the University of Oxford throughout the world.

Religious life
Dickinson has a number of different religious organizations, including the Harlow Family Hillel and the Asbell Center for Jewish Life, the Dickinson Christian Fellowship (DCF), the Dickinson Catholic Campus Ministry (DCCM), DiscipleMakers Christian Fellowship, and the Muslim Educational and Cultural Association (MECA).

Academic honor societies
National organizations recognizing academic achievement include Alpha Lambda Delta and Phi Beta Kappa. Dickinson's Phi Beta Kappa chapter, the Alpha of Pennsylvania, is the first established in the state.

Greek organizations
Dickinson College has three recognized fraternities: Delta Sigma Phi, Kappa Alpha Psi, and Sigma Lambda Beta. The college has five recognized sororities: Delta Nu, which was founded at Dickinson College in 1971; Kappa Alpha Theta, Kappa Kappa Gamma, Pi Beta Phi, and Sigma Lambda Gamma. Fraternities that are suspended, inactive, or not currently recognized by the school include: Kappa Sigma and Phi Delta Theta, both unrecognized by the school in 2017; Phi Kappa Sigma (Epsilon chapter), established in 1854 as the first fraternity at Dickinson until it was suspended in 2009; Sigma Alpha Epsilon, suspended in 2012; Theta Chi, unrecognized by school in 2008; Beta Theta Pi, which founded its Alpha Sigma chapter at Dickinson in 1874 and was suspended in 2000; and Sigma Chi, unrecognized by school in 2004.

The Dickinsonian
The Dickinsonian is a student-run newspaper published by students, first published in 1872.

School songs

The college's musical tradition dates back to at least 1858 when the Medal of Honor recipient and author, alumnus Horatio Collins King, wrote the alma mater, "Noble Dickinsonia" to the tune of "O Tannenbaum" ("O Christmas Tree"). In 1937 the college published a book titled Songs of Dickinson, which contains over 70 works from Dickinson's past. In 1953 the men's glee club recorded an album of college songs. In 2005–2006, The Octals, Dickinson's all-male a cappella group, recorded a similar CD.

Hat Societies
Dickinson College has four "Hat Societies" on its campus. This name is given by the distinctive hats members wear on campus. To gain admittance into a hat society, one is "tapped" as a junior by current senior members to then serve as a member during his or her senior year. The induction ceremony is known as a tapping ceremony. While membership criteria differ amongst the organizations, overall character, and general campus leadership are major requirements for membership in any of the organizations.

The four hat societies at Dickinson College are:
 Raven's Claw or "White Hats" - 7 senior men (est. 1896)
 The Order of Scroll and Key or "Gray Hats" - 7 senior men (est. 2001)
 Wheel and Chain or "Blue Hats" - 10 senior women (est. 1924)
 Queer Caps (est. 2008)

Alumni

Notable alumni of Dickinson College include Chief Justice of the United States Roger B. Taney (1795); President of the United States James Buchanan (1809); John Goucher (1868), the founder of Goucher College; Baseball Hall of Fame pitcher Chief Bender (1902); former chief of the Strategic Air Command of the United States Air Force (SAC) Richard H. Ellis (1941); baseball executive Andy MacPhail (1976).

Rankings and awards

 In 2010, Dickinson was one of only 15 schools to receive an A− in the Sustainable Endowments Institute's 2010 green report card.
 In 2010, the college was named a Sierra magazine "Cool School" in its Comprehensive Guide to the Most Eco-Enlightened U.S. Colleges.
 In 2010, the college's commitment to making a study of the environment and sustainability a defining characteristic of a Dickinson education landed it at the top of The Princeton Review's 2010 Green Honor Roll.
 In 2006, the college was ranked the most physically fit school in America by Men's Fitness.
 In 2006, Dickinson decided to stop publicizing its ranking in "America's Best Colleges" from U.S. News & World Report; however, in 2015 rankings Dickinson placed #40 among National Liberal Arts Colleges. In May 2007, Dickinson President William G. Durden joined with other college presidents in asking schools not to participate in the reputation portion of the magazine's survey.
 The Institute of International Education (IIE) ranked Dickinson No. 5 for a yearlong study abroad and No. 11 for semester-long study abroad in the baccalaureate category of its most recent Open Doors report (for the 2013–2014 academic year).
Dickinson is a perennial producer of Fulbright Scholars, and the Department of State's Bureau of Educational and Cultural Affairs has named Dickinson a Top Producer every year for the last six years. It is also a top producer of Peace Corps Volunteers, ranking 8th among small colleges and universities in 2014.
 In 2021 The Princeton Review ranked Dickinson College number two on their 2022 'Top 50 Green Colleges' List 
 In Howard and Matthew Greene's 2016 Edition of "The Hidden Ivies", Dickinson College was named one of "63 Top Liberal Arts Colleges and Universities".

References

External links
 
 Official athletics website

 
Carlisle, Pennsylvania
Educational institutions established in 1783
1783 establishments in Pennsylvania
Liberal arts colleges in Pennsylvania
Universities and colleges in Cumberland County, Pennsylvania
Private universities and colleges in Pennsylvania